"Little Bit Of Snow" was a 1987 single taken from British singer-songwriter Howard Jones' third studio album, One To One. No video was made to promote the single, which reached number 70 in the UK Singles Chart. The song was not released as a single in the US

Jones donated the song to the 1986 Anti-Heroin Project charity album, It's a Live-In World.  The use of the word snow in the lyrics referred to cocaine. It was the first of Jones' singles to be released on cassette. While not a huge success in the UK charts the track did reach top 40 in Ireland. The 12" contains two orchestral versions of Hide and Seek and Hunger for the Flesh, which were recorded at Abbey Road studios.

Track listing
7"
"Little Bit Of Snow" – 4:30
"Let It Flow" – 3:47

12"/cassette
"Little Bit Of Snow" – 4:30
"Let It Flow" – 3:47
"Will You Still Be There" (New Version) – 4:37
"Hunger For The Flesh" (Orchestral) – 4:58
"Hide and Seek" (Orchestral) – 7:09

Charts

References

External links
Artist discography at discogs.com
It's A Live-In World at discogs.com

1987 singles
Howard Jones (English musician) songs
Songs written by Howard Jones (English musician)
Song recordings produced by Arif Mardin